Events from the year 2009 in Sweden

Incumbents
 Monarch – Carl XVI Gustaf
 Prime Minister – Fredrik Reinfeldt

Events

Full date unknown
GuidePal company is founded in Stockholm.

Deaths

 3 January – Ulf G. Lindén, businessperson (born 1937)
 13 January – Folke Sundquist, actor (born 1925).
 15 January – Viking Palm, wrestler, Olympic champion (born 1923).
 17 January – Anders Isaksson, journalist (born 1943)
 30 January – Ingemar Johansson, boxer, heavyweight world champion (born 1932)
 31 January – Erland von Koch, composer (born 1910)
 31 August – Torsten Lindberg, footballer (born 1917).
 3 October – Olga Dahl, genealogist (b. 1917)
20 November – Elisabeth Söderström, singer (b. 1927)

See also
 2009 in Swedish television

References

 
Years of the 21st century in Sweden
Sweden
Sweden
2000s in Sweden